These are the full results of the 1999 South American Championships in Athletics which took place on June 25–27, 1999, in Bogotá, Colombia on Coliseo El Salitre. As the stadium is located 2600 meters above sea level, performances in some of the events were aided by high altitude.

Men's results

100 meters

Heats – June 25Wind:Heat 1: +0.4 m/s, Heat 2: 0.0 m/s

Final – June 25Wind:+0.9 m/s

Extra – June 25Wind: -0.6 m/s

200 meters

Heats – June 26Wind:Heat 1: +3.6 m/s, Heat 2: +3.3 m/s

Final – June 26Wind:+2.5 m/s

400 meters
June 25

800 meters
June 27

1500 meters
June 26

5000 meters
June 27

10,000 meters
June 25

110 meters hurdles
June 25Wind: +1.9 m/s

400 meters hurdles
June 26

3000 meters steeplechase
June 27

4 x 100 meters relay
June 26

4 x 400 meters relay
June 27

20,000 meters walk
June 26

High jump
June 26

Pole vault
June 27

Long jump
June 25

Triple jump
June 26

Shot put
June 25

Discus throw
June 26

Hammer throw
June 27

Javelin throw
June 27

Decathlon
June 25–26

Women's results

100 meters

Heats – June 25Wind:Heat 1: -0.7 m/s, Heat 2: +1.3 m/s

Final – June 25Wind:+0.3 m/s

Extra – June 25Wind: +2.3 m/s

200 meters
June 26Wind: +1.6 m/s

400 meters
June 25

800 meters
June 27

1500 meters
June 26

5000 meters
June 27

10,000 meters
June 25

100 meters hurdles

Heats – June 25Wind:Heat 1: +1.1 m/s, Heat 2: +1.1 m/s

Final – June 25Wind:+0.1 m/s

400 meters hurdles
June 26

4 x 100 meters relay
June 26

4 x 400 meters relay
June 27

20,000 meters walk
June 27

High jump
June 26

Pole vault
June 25

Long jump
June 26

Triple jump
June 27

Shot put
June 26

Discus throw
June 27

Hammer throw
June 25

Javelin throw
June 25

Heptathlon
June 25–26

References

South American Championships
Events at the South American Championships in Athletics